The sixth season of New Zealand reality television series The Block NZ, titled The Block NZ: Side X Side, premiered on 25 June 2017. It is set in the Auckland suburb of Northcote.

Bernadette Morrison and Jason Bonham, who were the judges in the fourth season, returned this season as the series judges.

There was strong uproar from the New Zealand public as a result of Andy & Nate taking the win at the auctions of this season. Many believed that they "stole" the win from Stace & Yanita by having their house put back onto the market after Stace & and Yanita had secured the win. Andy & Nate earned $31,000 over their reserve in their second auction, while Stace & Yanita had $20,000 and would have won the extra $100,000 in prize money had the fifth auction not taken place.

Contestants
The teams selected for this season are as follows:

Score history
The prize for winning room reveal is $5,000 cash.

Challenges

Team Judging 
The prize for team judging was $2,000 cash.

Auction

Notes

References

2017 New Zealand television seasons